is a point-and-click adventure game for the Wii console. It is the sequel to Another Code: Two Memories (known as Trace Memory in North America). Unlike its predecessor, the game has not been released outside Japan and Europe.

Gameplay
Players control Ashley Mizuki Robins via the Wii Remote, to explore, and solve puzzles, across Lake Juliet. Exploration gameplay is split into two distinct sections: exterior, and interior exploration. During map exploration of exterior locations, the player moves Ashley along set routes within 3D environments. During exploration of most interior areas Ashley is fixed to a set spot, and the player can rotate her perspective of the room, as well as move from room to room by selecting a doorway when it is within their view. During both exterior and interior exploration, the player can highlight select portions of the environment within the environment to examine them closer, and take a look at specific things of interest. By interacting with the environment, the player can enter certain items into their inventory. The player can also take photos of the environment, which can be used to solve various puzzles.

Interactions with non-player characters take the form of visual novel style segments, in which the player progresses through Ashley's conversation with the characters, and is occasionally prompted to pick a specific response. The player may also be required to present an item to someone.

The player must solve various puzzles throughout the game by utilising the Wii Remote's motion sensing capabilities. An in-game device which can unlock card-reader locks, the "TAS", is made to resemble a Wii Remote, and is used through the game by the player to access locked areas by completing unlocking sequences which utilise the remote's motion sensing and unique button layout. An updated model of the DAS from Two Memories (now modelled after the Nintendo DSi) acts as the player's menu, from which they can access various features, including in-game options such as viewing the photos on the DAS, as well as game options.

Despite the claims of the game's promotion and back-cover, the nunchuk is required in order to play the game, as it is needed to complete a late-game puzzle.

Plot
The story takes place two years after the events of the first game on the fictional Lake Juliet. At the end of the summer holiday, Ashley Mizuki Robbins, now 16-years old and an aspiring musician, receives an invitation with a package of newly modeled "DAS", containing a message from her father that he wants to bond with the two on a camping trip at Lake Juliet. Ashley arrives, but frustrated as her bag gets stolen. After a brief argument with her father, Richard, he reveals that he came to the lake to know why her mother, Sayoko was doing here 13 years ago, which much to her surprise, Ashley's been having brief flashbacks as soon as she arrived. He gives Ashely a "TAS", which Sayoko had built before death.

After camping, she meets a 13-year old boy named Matthew Crusoe, who is a runaway that came to search for his missing father, Michael in Lake Juliet. The two explore around the lake, as they recover missing items that were in Ashley's bag, and learns what happened to Michael: He was framed by the real culprits behind the pollution of the lake, and being followed ever since.

Ashley is called by her father to JC Valley, which much to her surprise, he never sent the message. After slowly unraveling the mystery inside JC Valley, Ashley learns the truth from Rex Alfred that  the lab's late-director Judd Fitzgerald had summoned Sayoko and gave her an ultimatum, which she chose her family over being a scientist. As a result, Sayoko's memory of her days as a scientist were erased, but Rex kept them in a pendant and gave it to her.

After Richard's memories were erased by Ryan, the cultprit behind the incident, Ashley uses the TAS to restore his memories. Both later discover that Ryan is the son of Judd before his memory wipe, and he's Sayoko's true killer. After failing to kill Ashley, Richard, and himself, Ryan decides to turn himself in.

A day later, Ashley returns home, with everything resolved. The game ends with Ashley in a band contest.

Development
The game was first shown at Nintendo's autumn conference in October 2008.

Reception

The game received a score of all four sevens for a total of 28 out of 40 from Japanese gaming magazine Famitsu. Elsewhere, it received a bit more mixed reviews than the original Another Code according to the review aggregation website Metacritic. It was the 11th best-selling game in Japan during the week of its release, selling fewer than 15,000 copies.

Chris Schilling of The Daily Telegraph gave the game 8/10. He gave praise to the puzzles and the touching story with its mature themes, stating that they help keep interest even when the game's story meanders. He also praised the game's watercolor visuals, saying that they make the world a pleasure to be in.

Despite mixed reception and lackluster sales, Another Code: R has gained a reception as an underrated game over the years. Chris Schilling of The Telegraph, who gave praise to the game in his review, rated Another Code: R as one of the top ten underrated games of 2009, in December of the same year. The game has particularly garnered some positive reception following the end of the Wii's lifespan. Kate Willaert of A Critical Hit put the game seventh in a shared seventh place in "Top 20 Games Nintendo Wouldn't Release In The US", alongside Last Window: The Secret of Cape West, another title by Cing. She said that it had a "beautifully designed and animated world" and also praised the game's cover art as "one of the nicest looking of 2009". GameCentral on Metro UK called the game a "hidden gem of the Wii", praising the graphics, animations, soundtrack, puzzles, and in particular, the story and Ashley's "realistically written" character. Game journalist Chris Scullion put Another Code: R in his list of the 30 best Wii games calling it "cracking" and considering Ashley to be a "rare" example of a "well-rounded female lead". A decade after the game's release, in 2019, Charles Herold of Lifewire called Another Code: R one of the "top 5 missing Wii games", referring to its lack of an American release.

Positive analysis has also been directed at its angle of storytelling. Anthony John Agnello of The A.V. Club has praised how the game's storytelling "thrived on boredom". He stated that Another Code: Rs story sandwiches exciting, large moments between hours of tedious conversations, in a way that allows the game to thrive on this, by making players experience the "beauty of real boredom [...] the color of a natural life", in a way that is "unexpectedly intoxicating". He compared the experience of Another Code: R "to waking up in the morning and realizing how miraculous it is that you are alive".

Ashley in her Another Code: R variation has appeared in the Super Smash Bros. for 3DS and Wii U and Super Smash Bros. Ultimate iterations of the Nintendo crossover fighting series Super Smash Bros.

Notes

References

External links

Official European site 
Official Japanese site 

2009 video games
Adventure games
Cing games
Nintendo games
Point-and-click adventure games
Touch! Generations
Video game sequels
Video games developed in Japan
Video games featuring female protagonists
Wii games
Wii-only games